This is an incomplete list of British blues bands and musicians.

Individuals

Ian A. Anderson
Elles Bailey
Ginger Baker
Long John Baldry
Chris Barber
Norman Beaker
Jeff Beck
Duster Bennett
Graham Bond
Marcus Bonfanti
John Bonham
Geoff Bradford
Jack Broadbent
Jack Bruce
Danny Bryant
Eric Burdon
Eric Clapton
Joe Cocker
Mike Cooper
Cyril Davies
John Dummer
Aynsley Dunbar
Chris Farlowe
Mick Fleetwood
Peter Green
Nicky Hopkins
Mick Jagger
Brian Jones
Laurence Jones 
Paul Jones
Wizz Jones
Jo Ann Kelly
Dave Kelly
Danny Kirwan
Alexis Korner
Paul Kossoff
Hugh Laurie
Alvin Lee
Aynsley Lister
Bernie Marsden
John Mayall
Chantel McGregor
Scott McKeon
Tony McPhee
Christine McVie
John McVie
Micky Moody
Gary Moore
Billy Nicholls
Jimmy Page
Robert Palmer
Ottilie Patterson
Ben Poole
Duffy Power
Rod Price
Chris Rea
Keith Relf
Keith Richards
Paul Rodgers
Matt Schofield
Todd Sharpville
Innes Sibun
Kim Simmonds
Jeremy Spencer
Chris Stainton
Rod Stewart
Mick Taylor
Joanne Shaw Taylor
Top Topham
Snowy White
Dani Wilde

Bands 

The Animals
Back Door Slam
The Birds
Black Cat Bones
The Blues Band
Blues Incorporated
Bluesology
Chicken Shack
Climax Blues Band
Cream
Downliners Sect
Dr. Feelgood
Fleetwood Mac
Foghat
Free
The Groundhogs
The Hamsters
Jeff Beck Group
The Jimi Hendrix Experience
John Mayall & the Bluesbreakers
Juicy Lucy
Keef Hartley Band
King King
Led Zeppelin
Love Sculpture
Manfred Mann
Medicine Head
The Original Rabbit Foot Spasm Band
Peter Green Splinter Group
The Poets
The Pretty Things
The Rolling Stones
Savoy Brown
Spencer Davis Group
Starlite Campbell Band
Steamhammer
The Steampacket
Taste
Ten Years After
Them
Tramp
Twice as Much
The Yardbirds
When Rivers Meet
Whitesnake
Wishbone Ash

References

Blues

Blues musicians